Nephopterix cleopatrella is a species of snout moth in the genus Nephopterix. It was described by Émile Louis Ragonot in 1887. It is found in Tunisia and Algeria.

References

Moths described in 1887
Phycitini